As the Cry Flows is an album by British band Seafood, released on 3 May 2004.

Track listing
All songs written by Seafood unless otherwise stated.

"I Dreamt We Ruled The Sun" – 5:18
"Heat Walks Against Me" – 3:36
"No Sense Of Home" – 4:31
"Summer Falls" – 4:59
"Kicking The Walls" – 3:21
"Milk And Honey" – 3:45
"1324" – 1:34
"Sleepover" – 4:59
"Good Reason" – 2:40
"Orange Rise" – 2:41
"Broken Promises" – 3:44
"Willow's Song" (Paul Giovanni) – 4:15

Personnel
David Line - Vocals, guitars
Kevin Penney - Guitars
Kevin Hendrick - Bass, vocals
Caroline Banks - Drums
Mark Van Hoen - Synthesizers
Ian McCutcheon - Percussion, keyboards, Hammond organ, backing vocals
Ed Harcourt - Piano, Hammond organ, Wurlitzer
Nick Zala - Pedal steel guitar, mandolin
Sam Lacey - Trumpet
Ros Murray - Cello

References

Seafood (band) albums
2004 albums
Cooking Vinyl albums